General elections were held in Northern Rhodesia on 16 September 1935.

Electoral system
The seven elected members of the Legislative Council were elected from seven single-member constituencies, with the Ndola seat split into two to form the new constituency of Nkana; Livingstone and Western had previously elected two members, but was reduced to one. There were a total of 3,203 registered voters.

Results
Voter turnout was 80% in the east and midland areas, 72% in Ndola and the south, 70% in the north and 50% in Nkana.

Aftermath
The newly elected Legislative Council met for the first time on 16 November 1935.

References

1935 in Northern Rhodesia
1935 elections in Africa
1935